Grant Hendrik Tonne (born 22 June 1976) is a German politician who became Minister for Education for Lower Saxony in 2017. Since 2020 he has been a member of the Landtag of Lower Saxony. 

Tonne has been one of the state's representatives on the German Bundesrat since 2017. He is a member of the German-Polish Friendship Group set up in cooperation with the Senate of Poland.

Early life and education 
Tonne was born in Bad Oeynhausen on 22 June 1976 and grew up in Leese.

After finishing his Abitur at the Städtisches Gymnasium Petershagen in 1995, he studied law at the University of Bremen until 2000, when he finished his first Staatsexam. In 2007, Tonne finished his second Staatsexam at the Higher Regional Court of Celle.

Political career 
Tonne joined the Jusos in 1996.

From 2006 until 2018, Tonne served as Mayor of Leese and was succeeded by Henning Olthage.

State Minister of Education, 2017–present 
After the Lower Saxony state elections in 2017, Tonne was sworn in as State Minister of Education at the constituent session of the 18th State Parliament of Lower Saxony on 22 November 2017.

Personal life 
Tonne is married to Monika Tonne-Herrmann, whom he has four children with.

References 

1976 births
Living people
21st-century German politicians
Social Democratic Party of Germany politicians
Members of the Landtag of Lower Saxony
University of Bremen alumni